The Sunset Derby is a 1927 American silent drama film directed by Albert S. Rogell and starring Mary Astor, William Collier Jr., and Ralph Lewis.

Cast
 Mary Astor as Molly Gibson  
 William Collier Jr. as Jimmy Burke  
 Ralph Lewis as Sam Gibson  
 David Kirby as Mike Donovan  
 Lionel Belmore as Jack McTeague 
 Burt Ross as Bobby McTeague 
 Henry A. Barrows as 'Lucky' Davis  
 Bobby Doyle as Skeeter Donohue  
 Michael Visaroff as Peddler

References

Bibliography
 Lowe, Denise. An Encyclopedic Dictionary of Women in Early American Films: 1895-1930. Routledge, 2014.

External links

Still at silenthollywood.com

1927 films
1927 romantic drama films
American romantic drama films
Films directed by Albert S. Rogell
American silent feature films
1920s English-language films
American horse racing films
First National Pictures films
American black-and-white films
1920s American films
Silent romantic drama films
Silent American drama films